The Sunrise River is a  tributary of the St. Croix River in east–central Minnesota in the United States.  It originates within the boundaries of the Comfort Lake - Forest Lake Watershed District near the city of Forest Lake in Washington County. It's headwaters are considered several small tributaries that flow into and contribute to Forest Lake, the longest of which is the Washington Judicial Ditch 6. From the outflow from Forest Lake, the river flows north, accepting the South Branch from the west near the city of Wyoming, and continues north into Mud Lake, where the West Branch, which rises in southeast Isanti County and briefly enters Anoka County, joins it near the city of Stacy.  From Stacy it flows generally north-northwest through Chisago County to meet the St. Croix River within Wild River State Park near the communities of Sunrise and Almelund.  Not far upstream from its mouth, the Sunrise collects its North Branch, which rises in Isanti County and flows through the city of North Branch.

Sunrise River is the English translation of the native Ojibwe-language name.

There is a dam on the Sunrise River.  The Sunrise River watershed spans 381 square miles in Isanti, Pine, Chisago, Washington, and Anoka counties.

See also
List of rivers of Minnesota
List of longest streams of Minnesota

References

Rivers of Anoka County, Minnesota
Rivers of Chisago County, Minnesota
Rivers of Isanti County, Minnesota
Rivers of Minnesota
Tributaries of the St. Croix River (Wisconsin–Minnesota)